The Seksyen 7 Shah Alam LRT station (Interim Name: i-City/Hospital Shah Alam) is a Light Rapid Transit (LRT) station that serve the Seksyen 7 in Shah Alam, Selangor, Malaysia. It serves as one of the stations on the Shah Alam line, which are planned to be opened on 2024. The station is an elevated rapid transit station forming part of the Klang Valley Integrated Transit System

The station is marked as Station No. 15 along the RM9 billion line project with the line's maintenance depot located in Johan Setia, Klang. The Hospital Shah Alam LRT station is expected to be operational in February 2024 and will have facilities such as public parking, kiosks, restrooms, elevators, taxi stand and feeder bus among others.

Locality landmarks
 Hospital Shah Alam
 Medan Selera Seksyen 7
 I-City Shah Alam
 Central I-City Shopping Mall
 Pusat Komersial Jalan Plumbum
 Giant Seksyen 7 Shah Alam
 UiTM Gate 2, Akademi Pengajian Bahasa
 Laman Seni 7
 Jakel Shah Alam
 Apartment PKNS Seksyen 7

References

Rapid transit stations in Selangor
Shah Alam
Shah Alam Line